Santa Maria della Concezione is the name of several churches.

 Santa Maria della Concezione dei Cappuccini in Rome
 Santa Maria della Concezione in Campo Marzio in Rome
 Santa Maria della Concezione delle Viperesche in Rome
 Santa Maria della Concezione a Montecalvario in Naples